Lucas Martín Ambrogio (born 14 July 1999) is an Argentine professional footballer who plays as a forward for Independiente Rivadavia on loan from Argentinos Juniors.

Career
Ambrogio played in the youth academy of Argentinos Juniors, having joined from Racing de Villa Mercedes in 2017. His breakthrough into senior football arrived at the beginning of 2019–20, as Diego Dabove selected the forward on the bench for a Primera División fixture with Banfield. Ambrogio subsequently appeared for his professional bow, replacing Damián Batallini for the final moments of a 3–2 win on 16 August 2019.

In August 2021, Ambrogio was loaned out to Independiente Rivadavia for the rest of 2021. In January 2022, the loan deal was extended until the end of 2022.

Personal life
In August 2020, it was announced that Ambrogio had tested positive for COVID-19 amid the pandemic. It was later declared a false positive.

Career statistics
.

References

External links

1999 births
Living people
People from Villa Mercedes, San Luis
Argentine people of Italian descent
Argentine footballers
Association football forwards
Argentine Primera División players
Argentinos Juniors footballers
Independiente Rivadavia footballers